National Route 306 is a national highway of Japan connecting Tsu, Mie and Hikone, Shiga in Japan, with a total length of 89.9 km (55.86 mi).

References

National highways in Japan
Roads in Mie Prefecture
Roads in Shiga Prefecture